Ángeles testigos de la Beatificación de Juan de Palafox y Mendoza (Spanish for "Angels witnesses of the Beatification of Juan de Palafox y Mendoza") is a sculpture by Leonardo Nierman, installed outside the Cathedral of Puebla in Puebla's historic centre, in the Mexican state of Puebla.

References

External links

Historic centre of Puebla
Outdoor sculptures in Puebla (city)